William Clarence Sarpalius (born January 10, 1948) is a former Democratic member of the United States House of Representatives, who from 1989 to 1995 represented Texas's 13th congressional district, a large tract of land which includes the Texas Panhandle eastward to Wichita Falls, Texas.

Biography 
Sarpalius was born in Los Angeles, California. As a young boy, he, his two younger brothers, and their mother were homeless in Houston, Texas. In 1961, when he was thirteen, he and his brothers were placed at Cal Farley's Boys Ranch near Amarillo. By the time he was nineteen, Sarpalius was the state president of the Future Farmers of America. He first attended Clarendon College in Clarendon in Donley County. 

He subsequently received a Bachelor of Science degree in agribusiness from Texas Tech University in Lubbock, from which he was later named a distinguished alumnus. In 1972, Sarpalius was hired by Cal Farley's Ranch as a vocational agriculture teacher at the school. In 1978, he left the ranch to return to school and received an M.B.A. from West Texas State University in Canyon, Texas. He then launched a career in agribusiness. He has a son, David William Sarpalius, from a former marriage. Sarpalius is Roman Catholic and affiliated with Lions International.

Congress 
In 1980, Sarpalius successfully ran for a seat in the Texas State Senate, a body in which he served until 1989. He was elected in 1988 to the U.S. House of Representatives, where he was a member of the Agricultural Committee. Sarpalius was one of a number of congressman involved in drafting the guidelines of the North American Free Trade Agreement. As a Lithuanian American, Sarpalius called for American aid to Lithuania, which was occupied by the Soviet Union and then reclaimed its independence at the end of the Cold War. In 1998, he was awarded the Order of the Lithuanian Grand Duke Gediminas, "the highest award and recognition that Lithuania could give to a noncitizen by the President of Lithuania."

"The president said some very nice things about my efforts in helping the Lithuanian people in their fight for freedom. He told the crowd about President Landsbergis's visit to my office that night in 1989 and the vision that he had shared with me. He acknowledged the members of Congress who had worked tirelessly to help the tiny Baltic states gain their freedom from the Soviet Union."

Sarpalius gained a second term in the House in 1990, when he defeated the Republican State Representative Richard A. Waterfield of Canadian in Hemphill County, who resigned from the legislature to make the congressional race. In 1992, Sarpalius halted the bid to return to Congress waged by former Republican U.S. Representative Beau Boulter of Amarillo, who vacated the House seat in 1988, when he waged a failed campaign to oust Democratic U.S. Senator Lloyd M. Bentsen.

In 1994, Sarpalius was one of a large number of Democrats unseated in the Republican Revolution. He lost to former Reagan administration official Mac Thornberry, taking only 45 percent of the vote to Thornberry's 55 percent. Thornberry would go on to hold the seat for almost a quarter-century. Since Sarpalius left office, the Democrats have only crossed the 30 percent mark in the district three times.

Later career 
Afterwards, Sarpalius was appointed by U.S. President Bill Clinton as a top official in the U.S. Department of Agriculture. He is currently the chief executive officer of Advantage Associates, a powerful Washington consulting firm made up of former elected officials. After the success of his book "The Grand Duke from Boys Ranch" he became a highly sought after motivational public speaker, speaking to crowds as many as 65,000.

References

External links
 
 
 

1948 births
Living people
American lobbyists
American people of Lithuanian descent
Clarendon College (Texas) alumni
Democratic Party members of the United States House of Representatives from Texas
Politicians from Amarillo, Texas
People from Donley County, Texas
Politicians from Houston
Politicians from Los Angeles
Recipients of the Order of the Lithuanian Grand Duke Gediminas
Democratic Party Texas state senators
Texas Tech University alumni
West Texas A&M University alumni
Catholics from Texas
Catholics from California
Educators from Texas
Members of Congress who became lobbyists